Érika Benilda Chávez Quinteros (born 4 June 1990 in San Lorenzo, Esmeraldas) is an Ecuadorian sprinter.

Career
At the 2012 Summer Olympics, she competed in the Women's 200 metres.

Personal bests
100 m: 11.54 s A (wind: -0.5 m/s) –  La Paz, 25 May 2012
200 m: 23.09 s A (wind: +0.6 m/s) –  Ciudad de México, 13 May 2012
400 m: 54.43 s A –  Zamora, 29 November 2008
400 m hurdles: 61.05 s A –  Zamora, 30 November 2008

Achievements

References

External links

Ecuadorian female sprinters
1990 births
Living people
Olympic athletes of Ecuador
Athletes (track and field) at the 2012 Summer Olympics
Pan American Games competitors for Ecuador
Athletes (track and field) at the 2007 Pan American Games
Athletes (track and field) at the 2011 Pan American Games
South American Games gold medalists for Ecuador
South American Games bronze medalists for Ecuador
South American Games medalists in athletics
Competitors at the 2006 South American Games
Competitors at the 2010 South American Games
Competitors at the 2014 South American Games
Olympic female sprinters
21st-century Ecuadorian women
20th-century Ecuadorian women